Alpine skiing is one of the 9 compulsory sports of the Winter Universiade, in addition to cross-country skiing. Skiing was present in all editions of the event beginning in 1960 Winter Universiade.

Events

Medalists

Men

Downhill

Super-G

Giant slalom

Slalom

Combined

Combined classification

Super Combined

Carving

Women

Downhill

Super-G

Giant slalom

Slalom

Combined

Combined classification

Super Combined

Carving

Mixed

Parallel team event

Medal table 
Last updated after the 2023 Winter Universiade

References 
Sports123

 
Universiade
Sports at the Winter Universiade